Dhaka North City Corporation (DNCC) or Dhaka Uttar City Corporation was created as an autonomous body that governs 54 northern wards of Dhaka to better manage local services, but has since added new areas. It is one of two municipal corporations in Dhaka, the other being Dhaka South City Corporation. Annisul Huq was the first mayor of the Dhaka North City Corporation, after being elected in April 2015. Md. Atiqul Islam is the current mayor of DNCC since 7 March 2019.  The area was 82.69 km2 until 2017 when it underwent expansion to 197 km2.  Bangladesh Bureau of Statistics (BBS) published Population and Housing Census 2022 with 5,979,537 people residing in it, for average density of 30,353 people per km2.

History

Dhaka North City Corporation was established on 29 November 2011. Prior to the establishment of the corporation, this urban area was governed by the former Dhaka City Corporation. The Dhaka City Corporation was dissolved by the Local Government (City Corporation) Amendment Bill 2011 on 29 November 2011, passed in the Parliament of Bangladesh, and formally ceased to exist on 1 December 2011, following the President's approval, making way for a Dhaka North and a Dhaka South city corporations. The mayoral elections are non-partisan in nature. The first Dhaka North City Corporation elections were held on 28 April 2015, which saw the victory of Annisul Huq in the first political campaign of his career after having achieved critically acclaimed success in the entrepreneurial and developmental sectors of Bangladesh.

However, Haq died suddenly on a trip to London, while visiting his daughter in November, 2017. In September, the local government ministry issued a circular, announcing the creation of a panel of three senior elected councilors who will act as joint Mayor.

The three panel members, based on seniority, are Ward 21 Councillor Md Osman Goni, Ward 4 Councillor Md Jamal Mostafa and Councillor from reserved Wards 31, 32 and 34, Begum Aleya Sarker Daisy.

Administration
Dhaka North City Corporation consists of 54 wards covering the thanas of  Turag, Uttara West, Uttara East, Uttarkhan, Dakkhinkhan, Bimanbandar, Khilkhet, Vatara, Badda, Rampura, Hatirjheel, Shilpanchal, Tejgaon, Sher-E-Bangla nagar, Mohammadpur, Adabor, Darussalam, Mirpur, Pallabi, Rupnagar, Shahali, Kafrul, Bhashantek, Cantonment, Banani and Gulshan.

Services 
The Dhaka North City Corporation is responsible for administering and providing basic infrastructure to the city.
 Evict illegal installations.
 Purify and supply water.
 Treat and dispose of contaminated water and sewage.
 Eliminate waterlogging.
 Garbage removal and street cleaning.
 To manage solid waste.
 To arrange hospital and dispensary.
 Construction and maintenance of roads.
 Installation of electric street lights.
 Establish car parking.
 Maintenance parks and playground.
 Maintenance of cemeteries and crematoriums.
 Preparation of birth and death registration certificate.
 Preserving the traditional place.
 Disease control, immunization.
 Establishment of city corporation schools and colleges.

Awards
 National ICT Award, 2017

List of Mayors 
 

Status

Elections

Election Result 2020

Election Result 2015

See also
 Districts of Bangladesh
 Divisions of Bangladesh
 Upazilas of Bangladesh

References

External links
 Official website

City Corporations of Bangladesh
Government of Dhaka